Henry Bowles may refer to:

Henry L. Bowles (1866–1932),  United States Representative from Massachusetts
Sir Henry Bowles, 1st Baronet (1858–1943), British soldier and politician

See also
Henry Bowl (born 1914), English footballer